The Temple of Azure Clouds, or Biyun Temple, is a Buddhist temple located in the eastern part of the Western Hills, just outside the north gate of Fragrant Hills (Xiangshan) Park, in Haidian District, Beijing, China, approximately 20 km from the city center. It was built in the 14th century (possibly in 1331), during the Yuan dynasty (1271–1368) and was expanded in 1748.

The temple, which is built on six levels over an elevation of nearly 100 meters, is known for its fine scenery. The temple also includes the Sun Yat-sen Memorial Hall, which is located at the center of the temple complex. Two other prominent features are the Arhats Hall and the Vajrasana Pagoda.

Inside Sun Yat-sen Memorial Hall lies an empty crystal coffin presented by the Soviet government in 1925 in memory of Sun Yat-sen (his body had already been entombed and placed at the temple pagoda until its relocation to Nanjing in 1929). Photos of Sun Yat-sen, his handwriting, books and statue are also on display on two sides.

There are 512 statues, which include 500 wooden Arhats, 11 Bodhisattvas and one statue of Ji Gong (a famous Buddhist monk) inside the Hall of Arhats. All the Arhats are vivid, life-size statues with different poses and expressions. It has been said that two of these Arhats were the statues of the Kangxi Emperor and the Qianlong Emperor of the Qing dynasty (1644–1911). In addition to these life-sized images, there is a miniature statue of Ji Gong perched on an overhead beam.

External links

Article about Temple of Azure Clouds
Photo of Temple of Azure Clouds

Buildings and structures completed in 1331
14th-century Buddhist temples
Yuan dynasty architecture
Major National Historical and Cultural Sites in Beijing
Buddhist temples in Beijing
Haidian District